West Mifflin Area High School is a 9-12 high school in West Mifflin, Pennsylvania, United States.

History
The "West Mifflin North High School" first opened its doors on Commonwealth Avenue in West Mifflin in 1960.  At that time, it was the only public High School in West Mifflin and did not have a senior class.  West Mifflin South High School opened on Camp Hollow Road in the following year, 1961, and became the second public High School in West Mifflin.  In 1962 there were two graduating classes in West Mifflin, the class of 1962 from West Mifflin North High School and the class of 1962 from West Mifflin South High School.

Later, West Mifflin South High School closed, leaving one high school open on Commonwealth Avenue named "West Mifflin Area High School". It is West Mifflin Area School District's largest and second most modern facility. Some of the amenities include a swimming pool, a fitness center, countless computer labs, recording studios, one of the largest auditoriums in the area, multiple gymnasiums, an automated Large Group Instruction Room, a greenhouse, as well as an extensive Library Information Center. Currently, through funding from the Classrooms for the Future program, technology has become an abundant resource at the school.

Freshman Academy
The high school was formerly home to a school-within-a-school concept known as the Freshman Academy until the 2011-12 school year.  The ninth grade students were taught in an exclusive wing of the complex, where they were guided on career and curriculum choices, school expectations, and given positive reinforcement for academic success.  The Academy also had its own principal, strengthening further the community atmosphere of this unique setting.

References

External links
 

Public high schools in Pennsylvania
Educational institutions established in 1956
Education in Pittsburgh area
Schools in Allegheny County, Pennsylvania
1956 establishments in Pennsylvania